Centro Atlético Fénix is a Uruguayan sports club from Montevideo. The football team currently plays in Primera División. Fénix is one of the most popular and traditional teams of Uruguay's 2nd Division, along with Racing Club de Montevideo, which is its all-time rival.

History
The club was founded on 7 July 1916 by a group of young men who named the club "Fénix" (Phoenix) after the mythological bird. The club's colors are violet (chosen to represent eternity) and white (to represent purity).

In 2002 the club qualified to play in Copa Libertadores for the first time after winning the Liguilla Pre-Libertadores de América title, a feat they repeated in 2003. The club were later relegated from the Primera División at the end of the 2005/2006 season.

Titles
Liguilla Pre-Libertadores: 2
 2002, 2003

Segunda División: 7
 1956, 1959, 1973, 1977, 1985, 2007, 2009

Tercera División: 3
 1942, 1949, 1991

Performance in Conmebol competitions
Copa Libertadores: 2 appearances
2003: First Round
2004: First Round

Copa Sudamericana: 3 appearances
2011: First Round
2016: First Round
2020: Round of 16

Players

Current squad

Out on loan

Managers
 Ricardo "Tato" Ortíz (Jan 1, 1994 – Dec 31, 1994)
 Juan Ramón Carrasco (Jan 1, 2002 – April 21, 2003)
 Antonio Alzamendi (April 21, 2003 – May 3, 2004)
 Miguel Ángel Piazza (May 3, 2004 – May 16, 2005)
 Jorge González (Oct 17, 2005 – June 30, 2006)
 Pablo Repetto (July 1, 2006 – Feb 28, 2008)
 Manuel Keosseián (Feb 28, 2008 – June 1, 2008)
 Jorge Giordano (July 1, 2008 – June 30, 2009)
 Luis López (July 2009 – September 2009)
 Julio César Ribas (Oct 5, 2009 – Jan 4, 2010)
 Rosario Martínez (Jan 5, 2010 – May 14, 2012)
 Lorenzo Carrabs (May 14, 2012 – June 30, 2012)
 Eduardo Favaro (July 1, 2012 – June 3, 2013)
 Lorenzo Carrabs (July 6, 2013 – Oct 28, 2013)
 Juan Tejera (Oct 29, 2013–)

Other teams
Centro Atlético Fénix also has a esports division, with squads of NBA 2K, Formula 1 and FIFA games.

References

External links

 

Fenix
Fenix
Fenix
1916 establishments in Uruguay
Capurro
Esports teams based in Uruguay